Olgina is a small borough in Narva-Jõesuu, Ida-Viru County in northeastern Estonia. At the 2011 Census, the settlement's population was 459, of which ethnic Estonians were 37 (8.1%).

References 

Boroughs and small boroughs in Estonia
Villages in Ida-Viru County